Mohit Sehgal (born 3 December 1985) is an Indian television actor. He is known for his roles of Samrat in Miley Jab Hum Tum, Somendra in Sarojini - Ek Nayi Pehal and Jay in Naagin 5.

Career 
After an unnoticed role in the 2007 film Delhii Heights, Sehgal entered TV industry playing Samrat Shergill, one of the leads opposite Sanaya Irani in the daily soap Miley Jab Hum Tum (2008–2010) which aired on Star One.

In 2010 he hosted Zara Nachke Dikha and Meethi Choori No 1. After participating in Zor Ka Jhatka: Total Wipeout, he played supporting roles in Saath Nibhaana Saathiya and Parichay — Nayee Zindagi Kay Sapno Ka.

Sehgal next portrayed Siddharth in Star Plus's Mujhse Kuchh Kehti...Yeh Khamoshiyaan opposite Mrunal Thakur(2012–2013). In last quarter of 2013, he was chosen to enact the role of Haider Sheikh opposite Ketki Kadam in romantic drama Qubool Hai until his exit in 2014. He was also seen in Tumhari Paakhi of Karan.

He was then roped in as the lead Somendra Singh in Sarojini (2015–2016) opposite Shiny Doshi. Sehgal next appeared in Box Cricket League before emerging as a second runner-up with Irani through participation in the dance reality series Nach Baliye.

In July 2017, he signed Star Plus's Love Ka Hai Intezaar where he was cast as Ayaan Mehta alongside Preetika Rao. 3 years later, he returned to screen with the fifth season of Ekta Kapoor's famous supernatural franchise Naagin in 2020 as antagonist Jay Mathur alongside Surbhi Chandna and Sharad Malhotra.

Personal life
On 25 January 2016, he married his co-actor from Miley Jab Hum Tum, Sanaya Irani in Goa.

Filmography

Films

Television

Awards and nominations

2014 Asian Viewers Televisions Awards for Best Supporting Actor for Qubool Hai  as Haider Sheikh

References

External links

Living people
Indian male television actors
21st-century Indian male actors
Indian male models
Male actors from Chandigarh
Indian male soap opera actors
Punjabi people
1985 births